Ługi  ≠is a village in the administrative district of Gmina Zakrzewo, within Złotów County, Greater Poland Voivodeship, in west-central Poland.

For more on its history, see Złotów County.

The village has a population of 120.

References

Villages in Złotów County